Dave Young (born January 13, 1982) is a Canadian multi-instrumentalist. He has been a member of several notable groups, including The Devin Townsend Band, Ten Ways from Sunday, Terror Syndrome, and The Matinée. He has also played on the album Alien by Strapping Young Lad. He plays guitar, keyboards, and several wind instruments. He played guitar in the live lineup of the Devin Townsend Project, alongside former bandmates Brian "Beav" Waddell and Ryan Van Poederooyen.

In 2016, Young and his brother Mike, also an accomplished session musician, founded a music production company called Young Brothers Productions.

References

1982 births
Canadian rock guitarists
Canadian male guitarists
Canadian rock keyboardists
Living people
People from Coquitlam
21st-century Canadian guitarists
21st-century Canadian male musicians